Drillia suxdorfi is a species of sea snail, a marine gastropod mollusk in the family Drilliidae.

Description
The length of the shell varies between 8 mm and 12 mm.

Distribution
This marine species occurs in the Atlantic Ocean off Southern Brazil and Argentina

References

 Hermann Strebel, Beiträge zur Kenntnis der Molluskenfauna der Magalhaen-Provinz p. 582; Jena,Gustav Fischer,1904-1907
  Tucker, J.K. 2004 Catalog of recent and fossil turrids (Mollusca: Gastropoda). Zootaxa 682:1–1295

External links
 

suxdorfi
Gastropods described in 1905